Redbank railway station is located on the Main line in Queensland, Australia. It serves the Ipswich suburb of Redbank.

Redbank station is beside the large Redbank Railway Workshops, where most of Aurizon's diesel locomotives are repaired and maintained, and where all wagons are made and repaired. The workshops also repair and overhaul City network electric multiple units. Near the station are coal train wagon storage roads used for the Jondaryan and McCallister coal mines, west of Toowoomba.

In May 2012, three stabling sidings were opened to the west of the station.

Services
Redbank is served by trains operating to and from Ipswich and Rosewood. Most city-bound services run to Caboolture and Nambour, with some morning peak trains terminating at Bowen Hills. Some afternoon inbound services on weekdays run to Kippa-Ring. Dinmore is seventeen minutes from Ipswich and 41 minutes on an all-stops train from Central.

Services by platform

*Note: One weekday morning service (4:56am from Central) and selected afternoon peak services continue through to Rosewood.  At all other times, a change of train is required at Ipswich.

Transport links
Westside Bus Company operate three routes via Redbank station:
500: Goodna station to Riverlink Shopping Centre
525: to Collingwood Park
526: to Springfield

References

External links
*Redbank station Queensland Rail
Redbank station Queensland's Railways on the Internet
[ Redbank station] TransLink travel information

Railway stations in Ipswich City
Redbank, Queensland
Main Line railway, Queensland